Outer dense fiber protein 2, also known as cenexin, is a protein that in humans is encoded by the ODF2 gene.

The outer dense fibers are cytoskeletal structures that surround the axoneme in the middle piece and principal piece of the sperm tail. The fibers function in maintaining the elastic structure and recoil of the sperm tail as well as in protecting the tail from shear forces during epididymal transport and ejaculation. Defects in the outer dense fibers lead to abnormal sperm morphology and infertility. This gene encodes one of the major outer dense fiber proteins. Multiple protein isoforms are encoded by transcript variants of this gene; however, not all isoforms and variants have been fully described.

References

Further reading